"Fall in Love" is a song recorded by Italian singer Ryan Paris.

Commercial performance 

On 5 March 1984, the song debuted at number 75 in Germany, eventually peaking at number 67 for one week.

Track listing and formats 

 Italian 7-inch single

A. "Fall in Love" (Vocal Version) – 3:50
B. "Fall in Love" (Instrumental Version) – 3:45

 Italian 12-inch single

A. "Fall in Love" (Vocal) – 6:40
B. "Fall in Love" (Instrumental) – 6:35

 German 7-inch single

A. "Fall in Love" (Vocal Version) – 4:20
B. "Fall in Love" (Instrumental Version) – 3:54

 German 12-inch maxi-single

A. "Fall in Love" (Vocal Version) – 7:30
B. "Fall in Love" (Instrumental Version) – 7:00

Credits and personnel 

 Ryan Paris – vocals
 Gazebo – songwriter
 Pierluigi Giombini – songwriter, producer, arranger
 Marcello Spiridioni – mastering
 Michele De Luca – cover art, photographer

Credits and personnel adopted from the 7-inch single liner notes.

Charts

Weekly charts

References 

1984 songs
1984 singles
Discomagic Records singles
Ryan Paris songs
Song recordings produced by Pierluigi Giombini
Songs written by Gazebo (musician)